Millville Area Junior Senior High School is a tiny, rural public school in Columbia County, Pennsylvania. It provides grades 7th through 12th. For the 2017–18 school year, enrollment was reported as 311 pupils.

Millville Area Junior Senior High School is the only high school operated by the Millville Area School District. High school students may alternatively attend Columbia-Montour Area Vocational-Technical School for training in the trades. The Central Susquehanna Intermediate Unit (IU16) provides the district with a wide variety of services like specialized education for disabled students and hearing, speech and visual disability services and professional development for staff and faculty.

Extracurriculars
The Millville Area School District offers a variety of clubs, activities and sports programs. Junior varsity and varsity athletic activities are under the Pennsylvania Interscholastic Athletic Association and the regional Pennsylvania Heartland Athletic Conference. The Pennsylvania Heartland Athletic Conference is a voluntary association of 25 PIAA High Schools within the central Pennsylvania region.

Sports
The district funds:

Senior high sports 

Boys
Baseball - A
Basketball- A
Soccer - A

Girls
Basketball - AA
Soccer - A
Softball - A

Junior high school sports

Boys
Basketball
Soccer

Girls
Basketball
Field hockey
Soccer

According to PIAA directory July 2014

References

Susquehanna Valley
Public high schools in Pennsylvania
Schools in Columbia County, Pennsylvania